Picochlorum oklahomense is a species of coccoid chlorophyte algae, the type species of its genus. It is broadly halotolerant, small, asexual and lacks chlorophyll b. The author of the name spelt the specific epithet "oklahomensis". AlgaeBase corrects this to the neuter form oklahomense, to agree with the genus name.

References

Further reading

Zhu, Yan. Biomass and flocculation characteristics of Picochlorum oklahomense and Nannochloropsis oculata. Oklahoma State University, 2012.
Dunford, Nurhan Turgut, Yan Zhu, and Carla Goad. "POTENTIAL OF PICOCHLORUM oklahomense AS FEEDSTOCK FOR BIOFUEL PRODUCTION."

External links
AlgaeBase

Chlorellales
Plants described in 2004